Coruxo Fútbol Club, is a Spanish football club based in the parish of Coruxo, Vigo, in the autonomous community of Galicia. Founded in 1930 it plays in Segunda División RFEF – Group 1, holding home matches at O Vao, with a capacity of 1,500 spectators.

The association also has its own futsal section, amongst others. In December 2010 Óscar Pereiro, a former Tour de France winner, joined the club after retiring from cycling and appeared for its reserves.

History
Founded in 1930, the club spent most of its history between the regional leagues and the Tercera División. In 2006–07, they finished second in that league and qualified for the play-offs, where they lost 4–2 on aggregate to CD Toledo. This qualified them for their first Copa del Rey campaign, which ended in the first round with a loss by the same score at home to CF Badalona on 29 August 2007.

Coruxo earned its first promotion to Segunda División B on 19 June 2010, with a 3–1 aggregate win over La Roda CF in the play-offs.

Club background
 Corujo Foot-ball Club (1930–1946)
 Corujo Sociedad Deportiva (1946–1954)
 Corujo Club de Fútbol (1954–1990)
 Corujo Fútbol Club (1990–1996)
 Coruxo Fútbol Club (1996–)

Season to season

11 seasons in Segunda División B
2 seasons in Segunda División RFEF
23 seasons in Tercera División

Current squad

Famous players
 Addison Alves
 Valery Karpin
 Javier Falagán
 Óscar Pereiro

References

External links
Official website 
Futbolme team profile 
Estadios de España 

Football clubs in Galicia (Spain)
Association football clubs established in 1930
1930 establishments in Spain
Sport in Vigo